Penicillium athertonense is a fungus species of the genus of Penicillium which is named after Atherton Tablelands where this species was found.

See also
List of Penicillium species

References

athertonense
Fungi described in 2014